Profile Systems and Software S.A. (frequently referred to as Profile Software) is a Greece-based international information technology company founded in 1990 that specialises in the development of financial services software. Its main activity is the provision of integrated business software particularly for financial institutions.

History
The company was founded in 1990 by Babis P. Stasinopoulos. Being an investor at Athens Exchange in the late 1980s, Stasinopoulos felt the need of software applications for automating workflow and helping with the investment decisions. Therefore, his idea was to fill this market niche.

For the first four years, his company operated as a private enterprise. In 1995 it was converted into a public limited company (societe anonyme) with an initial capital of  million. In 1999 its share capital was increased to  billion, while its turnover reached  billion. In the decade that followed, Profile Software was already the leading financial software company and one of the 10 largest IT companies in Greece. Its number of employees exceeded 150.

In August 2003, the company was listed on the Athens Exchange. In the following year it completed mergers through acquisition with BeCom and Analysis, as well as acquired a 70% stake in Globalsoft.

In 2007, the company began incorporating development of two large software products: the Financial Management System (FMS) and Universal Ticketing Solution (UTS).

By 2010, Profile had contracted such companies and organizations as National Bank of Greece, EFG Eurobank, ING, ABN AMRO, and public sector institutions.

Profile Systems and Software opened four new offices in major financial centers: Geneva, London, Dubai, and Singapore. It also expanded its promotional and marketing activities through a network of partners in Europe, the Middle East, and Asia.

In 2013, the company introduced the P2P Lending Software implemented in UK-based crowdfunding firms.

References

External links

Information technology companies of Greece
Financial software companies
Business software companies
Companies listed on the Athens Exchange
Software companies established in 1990
1990 establishments in Greece
Companies based in Attica
Nea Smyrni